Rannaküla may refer to several places in Estonia:

Rannaküla, Hiiu County, village in Hiiumaa Parish, Hiiu County
Rannaküla, Lääne-Nigula Parish, village in Lääne-Nigula Parish, Lääne County
Rannaküla, Lääneranna Parish, village in Lääneranna Parish, Pärnu County
Rannaküla, Muhu Parish, village in Muhu Parish, Saare County
Rannaküla, Saaremaa Parish, village in Saaremaa Parish, Saare County
Rannaküla, Tartu County, village in Elva Parish, Tartu County

Rannaküla, Laimjala Parish, former village in Laimjala Parish, Saare County